eLearnSecurity   (eLS) is an information technology security company that develops and provides proprietary certifications with a practical focus. eLearnSecurity deliver course material electronically through the distance learning model.

Courses 
Courses offered by eLearnSecurity focus on penetration testing, software reverse engineering, website security, mobile application security and network defense.

See also
 Ethical Hacking
 Tiger Team
 BackTrack

References

External links
 
 Review: EthicalHacker.net EthicalHacker.net review by Jason Haddix 
 Review: Darknet.co.uk Darknet review by Gareth Davis 
 Review: Security Ageis 

Professional titles and certifications
Information technology qualifications
Hacking (computer security)